The McDonald's Championship (sometimes called the McDonald's Open) was an international men's professional basketball club cup competition that featured a representative of the National Basketball Association (representing North America) against champion club teams from Europe, the National Basketball League (representing Oceania), and South America. The competition was launched as McDonald's Open in 1987 with FIBA sanctioning the event and it was renamed to McDonald's Championship in 1995. FIBA EuroLeague champions participated in the competition from its third edition in 1989, while NBA champions would join from 1995 and onwards. 

McDonald's Open received a lot of media and fan attention and it was held annually from 1987 until 1991. Although it was a weekend-long late-October preseason event, both FIBA and the NBA officially accepted it as a Championship. It was not held in 1992, 1994 and 1996 due to the participation of the NBA-bound Dream Teams in the Olympics and the FIBA World Cup, and also in 1998 because of the NBA lock-out.
The all-time scorer of the competition is Bob McAdoo with 158 points in two editions with Olimpia Milano, while Toni Kukoc is the tournament’s all-time leader in assists.

History
The first competition was held in 1987 and continued annually after that until 1991, when the tournament switched to a biennial event. For the first two years, the men's national teams from Yugoslavia and the Soviet Union participated.In each of the nine years the McDonald's Championship was held, the title was won by a team from the NBA, but twice by a close margin. The first time was in the semifinals in 1990, when the New York Knicks trailed Italian club Scavolini Pesaro by three points (107–104) with only 30 seconds on the clock. After successfully defending, the Knicks won possession and Gerald Wilkins netted a three-pointer with eight seconds remaining to send the game into overtime. The other close game came the following year in 1991, when the Los Angeles Lakers defeated Spanish champions Montigalà Joventut by just two points (116–114). Virtus Bologna played in the final in 1993 and 1995 losing both times to NBA teams, and alongside KK Split were the only teams to finish runners-up twice. In 1997 Atenas Cordoba was invited as South American champions for the first time in the history of the McDonald's Open. In 1999, the FIBA Asia basketball club champions, Sagesse Club, participated in the McDonald's Championship, the first and only time Asia was represented in the tournament.The McDonald's Championship was discontinued after 1999 following the 2000 FIBA–EuroLeague dispute which forced FIBA to ultimately lose control of its top-tier European club competition. 

Many famous NBA American players like Michael Jordan, Bob McAdoo, Larry Bird, Magic Johnson, Clyde Drexler, Sam Cassell, Hakeem Olajuwon, Kevin Johnson, Robert Parish, Charles Barley, Tim Duncan, Patrick Ewing featured in the competition. Other non-American players were Sarunas Marciulionis, Toni Kukoc, Arvydas Sabonis, Predrag Danilovic, Drazen Petrovic, Zarko Paspalj, Fabricio Oberto, Héctor Campana, Arturas Karnisovas, Dino Meneghin, Jordi Villacampa, Alexander Volkov 
and Riccardo Pittis.

Media coverage
In the United States, ABC held the network television rights from 1987-1989. Gary Bender and Dick Vitale provided the commentary for ABC's broadcasts. Supplemental coverage was provided by TBS.
Beginning in 1990, American network TV coverage moved over to NBC. NBC would continue to broadcast the finals of the McDonald's Championship through 1997.
TNT exclusively covered the final McDonald's Championship event in 1999. Marv Albert, Doug Collins, and Hubie Brown were the commentators for TNT in 1999.

Legacy
McDonald's Open served as a stepping stone for what happened in 1989, when the FIBA Congress dropped the word "Amateur" from its name. FIBA Secretary General Borislav Stankovic and David Stern (NBA Commissioner from 1984 to 2014), believed that basketball everywhere would benefit if the best players from all countries competed against each other.
In 1989, two years after the first McDonald's Open, the Federation Internationale de Basketball Amateur became the Federation Internationale de Basketball, and in 1992 in Barcelona, NBA players made up the USA Olympic squad and was famously dubbed Dream Team.

Format
After the first tournament (3 teams championship format), the competition was played in a single elimination format, with the winners of each match advancing to the next round.

Rules
The competition combined rules of both the NBA and the European leagues (FIBA rules).

Results

MVPs
The NBA’s teams dominated the competition and won all 9 tournaments with their stars picking up all the MVP awards. The award was named after Drazen Petrovic who lost his life in 1993.

Topscorers
Only three NBA players won the award: Michael Jordan, Patrick Ewing and Larry Bird.

Finishes

Top 4 finishes by team

Top 4  finishes by country

See also
 EuroLeague American Tour
 List of games played between NBA and international teams
 Naismith Cup
 NBA Canada Series
 NBA Global Games
 NBA versus EuroLeague games
 FIBA Intercontinental Cup

Notes

References

Sources
FIBA and McDonald's
1987-99

External links
NBA International Pre-Season and Regular-Season Games
List of champions at a-d-c

 
McDonald's basketball tournaments
International club basketball competitions
NBA vs FIBA
Recurring sporting events established in 1987
Recurring sporting events disestablished in 1999